Brian Karger (born 9 February 1967, in Horsens, Denmark) is a former international motorcycle speedway rider. He was a member of the Denmark speedway team when they won the 1991 and 1995 World Team Cup Finals. He also qualified for the 1992 World Final in Wrocław, Poland where he finished 16th (last) with 4pts scored, including a win in his final race.

He rode in the United Kingdom for the Swindon Robins, Arena Essex Hammers and also for the Belle Vue Aces. He rode in Sweden and won the Swedish Elitserien in 1988 with Bysarna. After retiring he became a notable engine tuner.

World Final Appearances

Individual World Championship
 1992 -  Wrocław, Olympic Stadium - 16th - 4pts

World Team Cup
 1989 -  Bradford, Odsal Stadium - (with Hans Nielsen / Erik Gundersen / Gert Handberg / John Jørgensen) - 2nd - 34pts (7)

References

1967 births
Living people
Danish speedway riders
Lakeside Hammers riders
Swindon Robins riders
Belle Vue Aces riders
People from Horsens
Sportspeople from the Central Denmark Region